The Chapel of la Tercera Orden Dominica is a colonial church building located in Santo Domingo, Dominican Republic. It was first constructed around 1514 by the Third Order of Saint Dominic, originally part of the Church and Convent of los Dominicos that together were the headquarters of the colonial Universidad Santo Tomás de Aquino. It was rebuilt in 1729 in its current aspect. It is currently home to Casa de la Juventud.

Gallery

See also
Universidad Santo Tomás de Aquino
Church and Convent of los Dominicos
List of colonial buildings in Santo Domingo

References

Roman Catholic churches in Santo Domingo
Ciudad Colonial (Santo Domingo)
1514 establishments in the Spanish Empire
Roman Catholic churches completed in 1729
1514 establishments in North America